Adrian Nilsen Pereira (born 31 August 1999) is a Norwegian professional footballer who plays as a left-back for Norwegian club Rosenborg.

He is a son of former Viking FK player Thomas Pereira. The Pereira name comes from Adrian Pereira's great-grandfather, who was born in Uganda and grew up in Portuguese Goa.

Club career
Pereira, at the age of 13, he was transferred to Viking. After four years he was promoted to the first team, and on November 26, 2017, he made his official, full debut in a match against Stabaek. A year later he signed his first professional contract, and gradually earned a regular place in the starting XI. In the 2018–19 and 2019–20 seasons he made a total of 39 appearances, scoring four goals, contributing eight assists, and celebrated one Norwegian Cup. In 2019 he was also called up to the Norway U 21 squad, for whom he has made two appearances.

On 12 September 2020, PAOK announced the signing of Adrian Nilsen Pereira from Viking, to four-year contract and wearing the number 16 jersey.
On 24 August 2021, PAOK accepted Rosenborg BK's offer for Pereira, and after a year returned to his homeland. PAOK had given €750.000 to the Viking in September 2020 but he did not establish himself with the club, and according to information, the transfer fee was a corresponding amount, keeping a resale percentage.

Career statistics

Club

Honours
Viking
Norwegian Football Cup: 2019
PAOK
Greek Cup: 2020–21

References

External links 
 Profile  for Viking FK

1999 births
Living people
Sportspeople from Stavanger
Norwegian footballers
Norway under-21 international footballers
Viking FK players
PAOK FC players
Norwegian Third Division players
Eliteserien players
Super League Greece players
Norwegian expatriate footballers
Expatriate footballers in Greece
Norwegian expatriate sportspeople in Greece
Association football defenders

Norwegian people of Goan descent